(Sanskrit) or  (Pāḷi) means "heaps, aggregates, collections, groupings". In Buddhism, it refers to the five aggregates of clinging, the five material and mental factors that take part in the rise of craving and clinging. They are also explained as the five factors that constitute and explain a sentient being’s person and personality, but this is a later interpretation in response to sarvastivadin essentialism.

The five aggregates or heaps of clinging are:

 form (or material image, impression)
 sensations (or feelings, received from form)
 perceptions
 mental activity or formations
 consciousness.

In the Theravada tradition, suffering arises when one identifies with or clings to the aggregates. This suffering is extinguished by relinquishing attachments to aggregates. The Mahayana tradition asserts that the nature of all aggregates is intrinsically empty of independent existence.

Etymology
 is a Sanskrit word that means "multitude, quantity, aggregate", generally in the context of body, trunk, stem, empirically observed gross object or anything of bulk verifiable with senses. The term appears in the Vedic literature.

The Pali equivalent word  (sometimes spelled ) appears extensively in the Pali canon where, state Rhys Davids and William Stede, it means "bulk of the body, aggregate, heap, material collected into bulk" in one context, "all that is comprised under, groupings" in some contexts, and particularly as "the elements or substrata of sensory existence, sensorial aggregates which condition the appearance of life in any form". Paul Williams et al. translate  as "heap, aggregate", stating it refers to the explanation of the psychophysical makeup of any being.

Johannes Bronkhorst renders  as "aggregates."

Description
The Buddha teaches in the Pali Canon the five aggregates as follows:
"form" or "matter" (Skt., Pāli रूप rūpa; Tib. གཟུགས། (gzugs); Ch. 色 (sè)): matter, body or "material form" of a being or any existence. Buddhist texts state rupa of any person, sentient being and object to be composed of four basic elements or forces: earth (solidity), water (cohesion), fire (heat) and wind (motion).
"sensation" or "feeling" (Skt., Pāli वेदना vedanā; Tib. ཚོར་བ། (tshor ba); Ch. 受 (shòu)): sensory experience of an object. It is either pleasant, unpleasant or neutral.
"perception" (Skt. संज्ञा saṃjñā, Pāli सञ्ञा saññā, Tib.  འདུ་ཤེས། ('du shes); Ch. 想 (xiǎng)): sensory and mental process that registers, recognizes and labels (for instance, the shape of a tree, color green, emotion of fear).
"mental formations" (Skt. संस्कार saṃskāra, Pāli सङ्खार , Tib.  འདུ་བྱེད། ('du.byed); Ch. 行 (xíng)): "constructing activities", "conditioned things",  "volition", "karmic activities"; all types of mental imprints and conditioning triggered by an object. Includes any process that makes a person initiate action or act.
"consciousness" (Skt. विज्ञान vijñāna, Pāli विञ्ञाण , Tib. རྣམ་ཤེས། (sna'i rnam par shes pa); Ch. 識 (shí)): "discrimination" or "discernment". Awareness of an object and discrimination of its components and aspects, and is of six types, states Peter Harvey. The Buddhist literature discusses this skandha as,
 In the Nikayas/Āgamas: cognizance, that which discerns.
 In the Abhidhamma: a series of rapidly changing interconnected discrete acts of cognizance.
 In some Mahayana sources: the base that supports all experience.

Interpretation

Aggregates of personality
The five aggregates are often interpreted in the later tradition as an explanation of the constituents of person and personality, and "the list of aggregates became extremely important for the later development of the teaching." According to this interpretation, in each skandha – body, sensations, perceptions, mental formations and consciousness – there is emptiness and no substance.

According to Damien Keown and Charles Prebish, skandha in the context of canonical Buddhism asserts that "the notion of a self is unnecessarily superimposed upon five skandha" of a phenomenon or a living being. The skandha doctrine, states Matthew MacKenzie, is a form of anti-realism about everyday reality including persons, and presents an alternative to "substantialist views of the self". It is a Buddhist reductionism of everything perceived, each person and personality as an "aggregate, heap" of composite entities without essence.

According to Harvey, the five skandhas give rise to a sense of personality, but are dukkha, impermanent, and without an enduring self or essence. Each aggregate is an object of grasping (clinging), at the root of self-identification as "I, me, myself". According to Harvey, realizing the real nature of skandhas, both in terms of impermanence and non-self, is necessary for nirvana. This 'emptiness from personality' can be found in descriptions of the enlightened, perfected state of Arhat and Tathagata, where there is no longer any identification with the five skandhas.

This 'no essence' view has been a source of sustained questions, major disagreements and commentaries since ancient times, by non-Buddhist Indian religions, as well as within Buddhist traditions. The use of the skandhas concept to explain the self is unique to Buddhism among major Indian religions, and must be seen in the contexts of polemics about the Sarvastivada teachings that "phenomena" or its constituents are real. It contrasts with the premise of Hinduism and Jainism that a living being has an eternal soul or metaphysical self.

David Kalupahana further explains that the individual is considered unreal but the skandha are considered real in some early Buddhist texts, but the skandha too are considered unreal and nonsubstantial in numerous other Buddhist Nikaya and Āgama texts.

Aggregates of experience and grasping
According to Thanissaro, the Buddha never tried to define what a "person" is, though scholars tend to approach the skandhas as a description of the constituents of the person. He adds that almost any Buddhist meditation teacher explains it that way, as even Buddhist commentaries from about 1st century CE onwards have done. In Thanissaro's view, this is incorrect, and he suggests that skandha should be viewed as activities, which cause suffering, but whose unwholesome workings can be interrupted.

Rupert Gethin also notes that the five skandhas are not merely "the Buddhist analysis of man,"  but "five aspects of an individual being's experience of the world [...] encompassing both grasping and all that is grasped."

Boisvert states that "many scholars have referred to the five aggregates in their works on Buddhism, [but] none have thoroughly explained their respective functions." According to Boisvert, the five aggregates and dependent origination are closely related, explaining the process which binds us to samsara. Boisvert notes that the pancha-upadanakkhanda does not incorporate all human experience. Vedana may transform into either niramisa or nekkhamma-sita vedana, vedana which is not harmful, or into amisa or gehasita vedana, a "type of sensation [which] may act as an agent bringing about the future arising of craving and aversion." This is determined by sanna. According to Boisvert, "not all sanna belong to the sanna-skandha." The wholesome sanna recognise the three marks of existence (dukkha, anatta, anicca), and do not belong to the sanna-skandha. Unwholesome sanna is not "conducive to insight," and without proper sanna, the "person is likely to generate craving, clinging and becoming." As with sanna, "not all sankhara belong to the sankharaskandha", since not all sankhara produce future effects.

According to Johannes Bronkhorst, the notion that the five aggregates are not self has to be viewed in light of debates about "liberating knowledge," the knowledge of Atman which was deemed liberating by the Vedic traditions. Bronkhorst notes that "knowledge of the self plays no useful role on the Buddha’s path to liberation." What is important is not to grasp at the forms, sounds, odors, flavors, objects, and mental properties which are perceived with the six sense organs (these include mind as the sixth sense organ). The insight that the aggregates are not self aids in letting go of this grasping.

Miri Albahari also objects to the usual understanding of the skandhas as denoting the absence of any "self." Albahari has argued that the khandhas do not necessarily constitute the entirety of the human experience, and that the Hindu concept of Ātman (eternal soul) is not explicitly negated by Pāli Canon. According to Albani, "anattā is best understood as a practical strategy rather than as a metaphysical doctrine." To Albahari, Nibbāna is an ever-present part of human nature, which is gradually "uncovered" by the cessation of ignorance.

In Theravada Abhidhamma

The Early Buddhist schools developed detailed analyses and overviews of the teachings found in the sutras, called Abhidharma. Each school developed its own Abhidharma. The best-known nowadays is the Theravāda Abhidhamma, but the Sarvāstivāda Abhidharma was historically very influential, and has been preserved partly in the Chinese Āgama.

Six sense bases

The internal and external sense bases together form the "six sense bases." In this description, found in texts such as Salayatana samyutta, the coming together of an object and a sense-organ results in the arising of the corresponding consciousness.

According to Bhikkhu Bodhi, the Theravada tradition teaches that the six sense bases accommodate "all the factors of existence", it is "the all", and "apart from which nothing at all exists," and "are empty of a self and of what belongs to the self".

The suttas themselves don't describe this as an alternative of the skandhas; it is in the Abhidhamma, striving to "a single all-inclusive system" that the five aggregates and the six sense bases are explicitly connected:
 The first five external sense bases (visible form, sound, smell, taste and touch), and the first five internal sense bases (eye, ear, nose, tongue and body) are part of the form aggregate;
 The mental sense-object (i.e. mental objects) overlap the first four aggregates (form, feeling, perception and formation);
 The mental sense organ (mind) is comparable to the aggregate of consciousness.

Bodhi states the six sense bases is a "vertical" view of human experiences while the aggregates is a "horizontal" (temporal) view. The Theravada Buddhist meditation practice on sense bases is aimed at both removing distorted cognitions such as those influenced by cravings, conceits and opinions, as well as "uprooting all conceivings in all its guises".

Eighteen Dhātus and Four Paramatthas

The eighteen dhātus – Six External Bases, Six Internal Bases, and Six Consciousnesses – function through the five aggregates. These dhātus can be arranged into six triads, each triad composed of a sense object, a sense organ, and sense consciousness.

The Abhidhamma and post-canonical Pali texts create a meta-scheme for the Sutta Pitaka's conceptions of aggregates, sense bases and dhattus (elements). This meta-scheme is known as the four paramatthas or ultimate realities, three conditioned, one unconditioned:
 Material phenomena (rūpa, form)
 Mind or Consciousness (Citta)
 Mental factors (Cetasikas: the nama-factors sensation, perception and formation)
 Nibbāna

Twelve Nidanas

The Twelve Nidanas is a linear list of twelve elements from the Buddhist teachings which arise depending on the preceding link. While this list may be interpreted as describing the processes which give rise to rebirth, in essence it describes the arising of dukkha as a psychological process, without the involvement of an atman. Scholars regard it to be a later synthesis of several older lists. The first four links may be a mockery of the Vedic-Brahmanic cosmogony, as described in the Hymn of Creation of Veda X, 129 and the Brihadaranyaka Upanishad. These were integrated with a branched list which describe the conditioning of mental processes, akin to the five skandhas. Eventually, this branched list developed into the standard twelvefold chain as a linear list.

According to Boisvert, "the function of each of the aggregates, in their respective order, can be directly correlated with the
theory of dependent origination - especially with the eight middle links." Four of the five aggregates are explicitly mentioned in the following sequence, yet in a different order than the list of aggregates, which concludes with :
 mental formations (saṅkhāra • saṃskāra) condition consciousness
 which conditions name-and-form (nāma-rūpa)
 which conditions the precursors (phassa  • sparśa) to sensations (vedanā)
 which in turn condition craving and clinging (upādāna)
 which ultimately lead to the "entire mass of suffering" (kevalassa dukkhakkhandha).

The interplay between the five-aggregate model of immediate causation and the twelve-nidana model of requisite conditioning is evident, for instance underlining the seminal role that mental formations have in both the origination and cessation of suffering.

Satipatthana
Mindfulness is thought to be applied to four upassanā (domains or bases), "constantly watching sensory experience in order to prevent the arising of cravings which would power future experience into rebirths," which also overlap with the skandhas. The four domains are:
 mindfulness of the body (kaya);
 mindfulness of feelings or sensations (vedanā);
 mindfulness of mind or consciousness (citta); and
 mindfulness of dhammās.

According to Grzegorz Polak, the four upassanā have been misunderstood by the developing Buddhist tradition, including Theravada, to refer to four different foundations. According to Polak, the four upassanā do not refer to four different foundations of which one should be aware, but are an alternate description of the jhanas, describing how the samskharas are tranquilized:
 the six sense-bases which one needs to be aware of (kāyānupassanā); 
 contemplation on vedanās, which arise with the contact between the senses and their objects (vedanānupassanā);
 the altered states of mind to which this practice leads (cittānupassanā);
 the development from the five hindrances  to the seven factors of enlightenment (dhammānupassanā).

In the Mahayana tradition
The Mahayana developed out of the traditional schools, introducing new texts and putting other emphases in the teachings, especially sunyata and the Bodhisattva-ideal.

India
The Prajnaparamita-teachings developed from the first century BCE onward. It emphasises the "emptiness" of everything that exists. This means that there are no eternally existing "essences", since everything is dependently originated. The skandhas too are dependently originated, and lack any substantial existence. According to Red Pine, the Prajnaparamita texts are a historical reaction to some early Buddhist Abhidhammas. Specifically, it is a response to Sarvastivada teachings that "phenomena" or its constituents are real. The prajnaparamita notion of "emptiness" is also consistent with the Theravada Abhidhamma.

This is formulated in the Heart Sutra. The Sanskrit version of the "Prajnaparamita Hridaya Sutra" ("Heart Sutra"), which may have been composed in China from Sanskrit texts, and later back-translated into Sanskrit, states that the five skandhas are empty of self-existence,

 and famously states "form is emptiness, emptiness is form. The same is true with feelings, perceptions, mental formations and consciousness."

The Madhyamaka-school elaborates on the notion of the Middle Way. Its basic text is the Mūlamadhyamakakārikā, written by Nagarjuna, who refuted the Sarvastivada conception of reality, which reifies dhammas. The simultaneous non-reification of the self and reification of the skandhas has been viewed by some Buddhist thinkers as highly problematic.

The Yogacara-school further analysed the workings of the mind, elaborated on the concept of nama-rupa and the five skandhas, and developed the notion of the Eight Consciousnesses.

China
Sunyata, in Chinese texts, is "wu", nothingness. In these texts, the relation between absolute and relative was a central topic in understanding the Buddhist teachings. The aggregates convey the relative (or conventional) experience of the world by an individual, although Absolute truth is realized through them. Commenting on the Heart Sutra, D.T. Suzuki notes:

The Tathāgatagarbha Sutras, treating the idea of the Buddha-nature, developed in India but played a prominent role in China. The tathagatagarbha-sutras, on occasion, speak of the ineffable skandhas of the Buddha (beyond the nature of worldly skandhas and beyond worldly understanding). In the Mahayana Mahaparinirvana Sutra the Buddha tells of how the Buddha's skandhas are in fact eternal and unchanging. The Buddha's skandhas are said to be incomprehensible to unawakened vision.

Tibet
The Vajrayana tradition further develops the aggregates in terms of mahamudra epistemology and tantric reifications.

Referring to mahamudra teachings, Chogyam Trungpa identifies the form aggregate as the "solidification" of ignorance (Pali, avijjā; Skt., avidyā), allowing one to have the illusion of "possessing" ever dynamic and spacious wisdom (Pali, vijjā; Skt. vidyā), and thus being the basis for the creation of a dualistic relationship between "self" and "other."

According to Trungpa Rinpoche, the five skandhas are "a set of Buddhist concepts which describe experience as a five-step process" and that "the whole development of the five skandhas...is an attempt on our part to shield ourselves from the truth of our insubstantiality," while "the practice of meditation is to see the transparency of this shield."

Trungpa Rinpoche writes (2001, p. 38):

See also

Anatta
Atman (Buddhism)
Nagarjuna
Pratitya-samutpada
Samsara
Sankhāra
Schools of Buddhism
Shunyata
Tathagatagarbha doctrine
Ti-lakkhana
Kosha

Notes

References

Sources

Primary literature

Sutta Pitaka
 
 Ñāṇamoli, Bhikkhu (trans.) & Bodhi, Bhikkhu (ed.) (2001). The Middle-Length Discourses of the Buddha: A Translation of the Majjhima Nikāya.  Boston: Wisdom Publications. .

Anthologies of suttas
 Bodhi, Bhikkhu (ed.) (2005a). In the Buddha's Words: An Anthology of Discourses from the Pāli Canon. Boston: Wisdom Pubs. .

Single sutras
 Thanissaro Bhikkhu (trans.) (1998). Culavedalla Sutta: The Shorter Set of Questions-and-Answers [MN 44].
 Thanissaro Bhikkhu (trans.) (2001a). Khajjaniya Sutta: Chewed Up [SN 22.79].
Thanissaro Bhikkhu (trans.) (2001b). Maha-punnama Sutta: The Great Full-moon Night Discourse [MN 109].

Abhidhamma, Pali commentaries, modern Theravada
 Bodhi, Bhikkhu (ed.) (2000a). A Comprehensive Manual of Abhidhamma: The Abhidhammattha Sangaha of Ācariya Anuruddha.  Seattle, WA: BPS Pariyatti Editions. .
 Bodhi, Bhikkhu (18 Jan 2005b). MN 10: Satipatthana Sutta (continued) Ninth dharma talk on the Satipatthana Sutta (MP3 audio file).
 Buddhaghosa, Bhadantācariya (trans. from Pāli by Bhikkhu Ñāṇamoli) (1999). The Path of Purification: Visuddhimagga. Seattle, WA: BPS Pariyatti Editions. .
 Ñāṇamoli, Bhikkhu (trans.) (1998). Mindfulness of Breathing (Ānāpānasati): Buddhist texts from the Pāli Canon and Extracts from the Pāli Commentaries. Kandy, Sri Lanka: Buddhist Publication Society. .
 Soma Thera (trans.) (2003). The Way of Mindfulness. Kandy, Sri Lanka: Buddhist Publication Society. .
 Thanissaro Bhikkhu (2002). Five Piles of Bricks: The Khandhas as Burden & Path.

Mahayana
 Fremantle, Francesca & Trungpa, Chõgyam (2003). The Tibetan Book of the Dead: The Great Liberation Through Hearing in the Bardo. Boston: Shambhala Publications. .
 Nhât Hanh, Thich (1988). The Heart of Understanding: Commentaries on the Prajnaparamita Heart Sutra. Berkeley, CA: Parallax Press. .
 Nhât Hanh, Thich (1999). The Heart of the Buddha's Teaching. NY: Broadway Books. .
 
 Suzuki, Daisetz Teitaro (1960). Manual of Zen Buddhism. NY: Grove Press. .
Trungpa, Chögyam (1976). The Myth of Freedom and the Way of Meditation. Boulder: Shambhala. .
 Trungpa, Chögyam (1999). The Essential Chögyam Trungpa. Boston: Shambhala.  .
 Trungpa, Chögyam (2001). Glimpses of Abhidharma. Boston: Shambhala. .
 Trungpa, Chögyam (2002). Cutting Through Spiritual Materialism. Boston: Shambhala. .

Secondary literature

 
 
 

 

 Gal, Noa (July 2003). The Rise of the Concept of ‘Own-Nature’: (Sabhāva) in the Paisambhidāmagga [excerpt from Ph.D. thesis]. Oxford: Wolfson College. Retrieved 2008-01-22 from "Oxford Centre for Buddhist Studies" at Internet Archive.
 
 

 Sue Hamilton. "From the Buddha to Buddhaghosa: Changing Attitudes Toward the Human Body in Theravāda Buddhism." In Religious Reflections on the Human Body, edited by Jane Marie Law. Bloomington and Indianapolis: Indiana University Press, 1995, pp. 46–63.
 Sue Hamilton. Identity and Experience: the Constitution of the Human Being According to Early Buddhism. London: Luzac Oriental, 
 1996.

 Jinpa, Thupten (2002). Self, Reality and Reason in Tibetan Philosophy: Tsongkhapa's Quest for the Middle Way. Routledge.
 
 

 Kalupahana, David (1975). Causality: The Central Philosophy of Buddhism. The University Press of Hawaii.
 

 
 

 

 Nattier, Jan (1992). "The Heart Sutra: A Chinese Apocryphal Text?" Journal of the International Association of Buddhist Studies, vol. 15, no. 2, pp. 153–223.

 

 Rawson, Philip (1991). Sacred Tibet. NY: Thames and Hudson. .

Web-sources

External links

Theravada
Khandavagga suttas (a selection), translated primarily by Thanissaro Bhikkhu.

Mahayana
, table showing the five skandhas, prepared by Alan Fox (Dept. of Philosophy, U. of Delaware).

Vajrayana
A View on Buddhism: Mind and Mental Factors, web page including description of the Five Aggregates.

Eighteen dhātus
Twelve nidānas
Sanskrit words and phrases

ko:온 (불교)